Jesús Gil Manzano (born 4 February 1984) is a Spanish football referee. He officiates in the Spanish Primera División. He made his La Liga debut on 25 August 2012 in a game between Málaga and Mallorca. Gil Manzano also appeared in the 2013–14 Copa del Rey quarterfinals game between Racing de Santander and Real Sociedad, where Racing refused to play after one minute.

Following the game between Barcelona and Girona on 23 September 2018, that ended 2–2, Lionel Messi refused to shake his hand after the match.

Record

References

External links
 

1984 births
Living people
Spanish football referees
People from Don Benito
Sportspeople from the Province of Badajoz
Copa América referees
UEFA Champions League referees
UEFA Europa League referees